Plamen is a Bulgarian masculine given name. It may refer to:

Plamen Dimov (born 1990), Bulgarian soccer player
Plamen Donev (born 1956), former Bulgarian footballer who currently manages PFC Svetkavitsa
Plamen Getov (born 1959), retired Bulgarian footballer who played as either an attacking midfielder or a striker
Plamen Goranov Bulgarian protest leader and self-immolator
Plamen Grozdanov (born 1950), the Ambassador Extraordinary and Plenipotentiary of the Republic of Bulgaria to the Russian Federation
Plamen Iliev (goalkeeper) (born 1991), Bulgarian football goalkeeper
Plamen Kolev (born 1988), Bulgarian footballer
Plamen Konstantinov (born 1973), former Bulgarian volleyball player and captain of the Bulgaria men's national volleyball team
Plamen Kozhuharov (born 1992), Bulgarian football player, currently playing as a midfielder
Plamen Krachunov (born 1989), Bulgarian footballer who currently plays as a defender
Plamen Kralev (born 1973), Bulgarian racing driver and businessman
Plamen Krastev (born 1958), retired Bulgarian Olympic hurdler
Plamen Krumov (footballer born 1975), Bulgarian forward
Plamen Krumov (footballer, born 1985), Bulgarian defender/midfielder
Plamen Markov (born 1957), retired Bulgarian international footballer who played as a midfielder
Plamen Maslarov (1950–2010), Bulgarian film director and theater director, head of the Bulgarian National Film Archive 2004–2010
Plamen Minev (born 1965), former hammer thrower from Bulgaria, who competed for his native country at two Summer Olympics
Plamen Nikolov (footballer born 1957) (born 1957), former Bulgarian football defender
Plamen Nikolov (footballer born 1961) (born 1961), Bulgarian football goalkeeper
Plamen Nikolov (footballer born 1985) (born 1985), Bulgarian footballer
Plamen Petrov (born 1985), Bulgarian football player

See also
M-63 Plamen, Yugoslav multiple rocket launcher
Novi Plamen (English: New Flame) is a left-wing magazine for political, social and cultural issues aimed at intellectual readers in the former Yugoslavia

Slavic masculine given names
Bulgarian masculine given names